Lata is the provincial capital of Temotu Province, Solomon Islands. As of 2007, it had 553 inhabitants. There are a few rest houses for overnight stays. There is a post office, telecom office and numerous stores.

The town contains a small air strip with flights to Makira and Honiara.  Shipping service is irregular, but occasionally transport can be found to Honiara or the outer islands.  Outboard canoe travel around the island of Nendo or to the Reef Islands is possible.

Temotu Province's main hospital, Lata Hospital is situated in Lata town.

The only fixed-wing service is by Solomon Airlines.  The Regional Assistance Mission to Solomon Islands (RAMSI) used to provide its own helicopter flights fortnightly to Lata.

During the ethnic tensions of 2003, there were no problems in Lata, mainly due to its being so far away from the capital, Honiara.

Lata is serviced by one free to air analogue television channel broadcast in the VHF band on 175.25MHz providing a mix of sport and news content. The channel is provided by Telekom Television, wholly owned by Solomon Telekom one of two telecommunications providers in the Solomon Islands.

Climate
Lata has a tropical rainforest climate (Af) with very heavy rainfall year-round.

References

 

Populated places in Temotu Province